The Phogat sisters are six sisters from Haryana, India, all of whom are wrestlers. In order of their birth, they are Geeta, Babita, Priyanka, Ritu, Vinesh, and Sangeeta. While Geeta, Babita, Ritu, and Sangeeta are daughters of former wrestler and coach Mahavir Singh Phogat, Priyanka and Vinesh were brought up by Mahavir after their father, who is the younger brother of Mahavir, died when they were young. Mahavir trained all six of them in wrestling in their home village of Balali in Bhiwani district.

Three of the Phogat sisters, Geeta, Babita, and Vinesh, are gold medalists in different weight categories at the Commonwealth Games, while Priyanka has won a silver medal at the Asian Championships. Ritu is a National Championships gold medalist and Sangita has won medals at age-level international championships.

The success of the Phogat sisters has attracted substantial media attention, particularly in light of prevalent social issues in Haryana such as gender inequality, female foeticide, and child marriage. 
Chandgi Ram's daughters, Sonika and Deepika, sowed the seeds of encouraging girls to take up women's wrestling in the 1990s; his protege Mahavir Phogat's daughters revolutionized wrestling, and then Sakshi Malik won an Olympic medal, which led to a big change in the mentality towards women wrestling.

Background
Mahavir Singh Phogat is a former wrestler from Balali village in Bhiwani district, Haryana, who became a wrestling coach. His father Man Singh was also a wrestler. Mahavir and his wife Daya Kaur have five children: daughters Geeta, Babita, Ritu, and Sangita, and the youngest being son Dushyant and the youngest being  Mahavir's brother Rajpal's daughters Priyanka and Vinesh were brought up by Mahavir after the death of their father.

Mahavir was inspired to train his daughters in wrestling when weightlifter Karnam Malleswari became the first Indian woman to win an Olympic medal in 2000. He was also influenced by his coach Chandgi Ram, who had taught wrestling to his own daughters. Kaur recollects, "I told my husband not to push the girls into the sport. I was worried about how they will ever get married as pehelwans wearing shorts and cutting their hair!" Regarding the opposition by the villagers against training his daughters, Mahavir said, "Everyone said I was bringing shame to our village by training my girls, but I thought, if a woman can be Prime Minister of a country, why can't she be a wrestler?" Deprived of proper facilities in his village where his daughters wrestled against boys, Mahavir enrolled Geeta and Babita into the Sports Authority of India center in Sonipat.

Details

In popular culture
The Bollywood film Dangal, released in India on 23 December 2016, is based on the lives of Phogat sisters Geeta and Babita. Wrestler Pooja Dhanda was screened and originally selected to play the role of Babita Phogat in Dangal, which she could not play due to an injury.

References

 
Sibling groups
Sport wrestlers from Haryana
Sportswomen from Haryana
People from Bhiwani district